Sarabah is a locality in the Scenic Rim Region, Queensland, Australia.

Geography 
Canungra Creek forms part of the south-eastern boundary before flowing through to the north.

History 
Sarabah Provisional School opened on 6 June 1892 and closed in June 1899.

The locality contains 25 households, in which 48.0% of the population are males and 52.0% of the population are females. The population's media age of 56 is 18 years above the national average. The average weekly household income is $1,437, $1 below the national average.

References 

Localities in Queensland
Scenic Rim Region